Gérard Buscher (born 5 November 1960 in Algiers) is a French association football manager and former professional player.

Buscher has a son, Mickaël Buscher who last played for Tunisian CA Bizertin.

References

 French Football Federation Profile 
 

1960 births
Living people
Footballers from Nice
Pieds-Noirs
Association football forwards
French footballers
France international footballers
OGC Nice players
FC Nantes players
Stade Brestois 29 players
Racing Club de France Football players
Montpellier HSC players
Valenciennes FC players
Ligue 1 players
Ligue 2 players
French football managers
OGC Nice managers
CS Hammam-Lif managers
Club Athlétique Bizertin managers
AS Marsa managers
Al-Ittihad Kalba SC managers
Stade Gabèsien managers
French expatriate football managers
Expatriate football managers in Tunisia
French expatriate sportspeople in Tunisia
Expatriate football managers in the United Arab Emirates
French expatriate sportspeople in the United Arab Emirates
Tunisian Ligue Professionnelle 1 managers
UAE Pro League managers